The Hartlaber is a stream in Bavaria, Germany. It is a distributary of the Große Laber in Lower Bavaria.

Course 
The Hartlaber branches off the Große Laber west from Sünching-Haidenkofen to the right. After 8.38 km it flows back into the Große Laber between Mötzing-Oberhaimbuch and -Schönach.

Main tributaries 
 Moosbach
 Röhrbach

See also 
List of rivers of Bavaria

External links 

 Verlauf der Hartlaber auf: 
 Ökologische Umgestaltungen, Wasserwirtschaftsamt Regensburg
 Hartlaber renaturiert, haidenkofen.de

Rivers of Bavaria
Rivers of Germany